Mallepalli is a village in Brahmamgarimattam mandal, situated in Kadapa District of Andhra Pradesh, India.

Demographics 

The total population constitutes  males,  females and  children, in the age group of 0–6 years. The average literacy rate stands at 57.33% with  literates, significantly higher than the national average of 73.00%.

References

Villages in Kadapa district